Stary Targ  (literally "Old Market"; formerly ) is a village in Sztum County, Pomeranian Voivodeship, in northern Poland. It is the seat of the gmina (administrative district) called Gmina Stary Targ.

The village has a population of 1,000.

History
The village was founded by Komtur Hermann von Schönberg sometime between 1271 and 1276 and granted town privileges based on the city law of Chełmno. The town church, dedicated to saints Simon and Jude, was probably constructed sometime after 1320. At the outbreak of the Second Northern War the village had a population of 25 agriculturalists, two tavern-keepers, one miller and a mayor. In 1664, following the war, the population had diminished to three farmers, one miller, one inn-keeper and the mayor. In 1820 the village had 422 inhabitants, in 1905 the number was 1047 and in 1939 it was 1283. During the 1920 East Prussian plebiscite, the village was one of only a few places where a majority voted to become part of Poland rather than Germany.

The Truce of Altmark between the Polish–Lithuanian Commonwealth and Sweden was signed in the village in 1629.

References

Villages in Sztum County